Carla Beck is a Canadian politician who has served as leader of the Saskatchewan New Democratic Party since 2022. She was elected to the Legislative Assembly of Saskatchewan in the 2016 provincial election. She represents the electoral district of Regina Lakeview.

Background and education 
Beck was born in Weyburn and grew up on a mixed farm near Lang, Saskatchewan. She attended elementary school in Lang and high school in the neighbouring community of Milestone.

She graduated with a Bachelor of Arts degree in Sociology from the University of Regina in 1998. She earned a Bachelor of Social Work degree from the University of Regina in 2004.

Career 
Beck has been the NDP Education critic during the COVID-19 pandemic in Saskatchewan. Prior to entering politics, Beck was the assistant executive director at a Regina women's shelter. A registered social worker, she has over 20 years’ experience in that field, including work with Dales House, the Paul Dojack Centre, and the Regina General Hospital’s Women and Children’s Team.

Beck has been an active volunteer and leader in the community including work with the Sask. Abilities Council, Saskatchewan Coalition Against Racism, Saskatchewan Action Committee—Status of Women, Camp Easter Seal, Autism Resource Centre, the help line at Regina Sexual Assault Centre, MS Society, Cathedral Village Arts Festival, Cathedral Area Community Association, soccer, softball, baseball, hockey, and FADA Dance.

Beck was a founding member and spokesperson for RealRenewal, a Regina coalition of parents and community members formed in December in response to the Regina Public School Board’s 10-Year Renewal Plan to close up to 16 inner city schools.  As a member of the School Community Council at Connaught, she organized a walking school bus and walk to school event to draw attention to the benefits of local neighbourhood schools. She also served as a board member for two community preschools.

In 2009, Beck was elected as the Trustee for Subdivision 5 on Regina Public School Board and was subsequently re-elected for a second term in 2012.  During her tenure on the school board, she served as Vice-Chair and as the chair of the audit and policy committee.

In 2015, Beck won a contested NDP nomination race for the constituency of Regina Lakeview.  She subsequently was elected to the Legislative Assembly in the 2016 provincial election, winning 56.49% of the vote.  In the 2020 provincial election, Beck was re-elected by a wider margin with 65.47% of the vote in Regina Lakeview.

Beck has served as the Opposition critic for Education, Early Learning and Child Care since 2016. She is also currently serves as the Opposition Caucus Chair and the critic for Labour.  Beck also previously served as Deputy Leader of the Opposition.

Following the resignation of Cam Broten as the Saskatchewan NDP leader following the provincial election in 2016, Beck was considered as a possible leadership candidate. She confirmed her decision not to enter the race on June 22, 2017.

On March 3, 2022, Beck announced her candidacy in the 2022 Saskatchewan New Democratic Party leadership election. As party members met in Regina on June 26, 2022, Carla became the party's first elected female leader.

Electoral results

References

Living people
Saskatchewan New Democratic Party MLAs
Women MLAs in Saskatchewan
Politicians from Regina, Saskatchewan
21st-century Canadian politicians
21st-century Canadian women politicians
Year of birth missing (living people)
Leaders of the Saskatchewan CCF/NDP
Female Canadian political party leaders